The Dutch [open] computer chess championship was a chess tournament for computer chess programs held from 1981 to 2012. It was organised yearly by the CSVN (Computer Chess Association of the Netherlands) around October or November.

Champions

{| class="sortable wikitable"
! # !! Year !! Program !! Champion
|-
| 1||1981||YNCT 1.0||Luuk de Vries
|-
| 2||1982||Gambiet 82||Wim Rens
|-
| 3||1983||Chess 0.5X||Wim Elsenaar
|-
| 4||1984||Chess 0.5X||Wim Elsenaar
|-
| 5||1985||Nona||Frans Morsch
|-
| 6||1986||Nona||Frans Morsch
|-
| 7||1987||REBEL||Ed Schröder
|-
| 8||1988||Quest||Frans Morsch
|-
| 9||1989||REBEL||Ed Schröder
|-
| 10||1990||REBEL||Ed Schröder
|-
| 11||1991||The King||Johan de Koning
|-
| 12||1992||REBEL||Ed Schröder
|-
| 13||1993||The King||Johan de Koning
|-
| 14||1994||Quest||Frans Morsch
|-
| 15||1995||The King||Johan de Koning
|-
| 16||1996||CilkChess||MIT team
|-
| 17||1997||Nimzo||Christian Donninger
|-
| 18||1998||The King||Johan de Koning
|-
| 19||1999||Quest||Frans Morsch, Mathias Feist
|-
| 20||2000||Chess Tiger||Christophe Théron, Jeroen Noomen
|-
| 21||2001||Chess Tiger||Christophe Théron, Jeroen Noomen
|-
| 22||2002||Chess Tiger||Christophe Théron, Jeroen Noomen
|-
| 23||2003||Ruffian||Perola Valfridsson, Martin Blume, Djordje Vidanovic
|-
| 24||2004||Diep ||Vincent Diepeveen
|-
| 25||2005||Zappa||Anthony Cozzie, Erdogan Günes
|-
| 26||2006||Rybka||Vasik Rajlich, Jeroen Noomen
|-
| 27||2007||Rybka||Vasik Rajlich, Jeroen Noomen
|-
| 28||2008||Rybka||Vasik Rajlich, Jeroen Noomen
|-
| 29||2009||Rybka||Vasik Rajlich, Lukas Cimiotti (hardware), Jiří Dufek (opening book), Hans van der Zijden (operator)
|-
| 30||2010||Rybka||Vasik Rajlich, Lukas Cimiotti (hardware), Jiří Dufek (opening book), Hans van der Zijden (operator)
|-
| 31||2011||Pandix||Gyula Horváth
|-
| 32||2012||Rybka||Vasik Rajlich
|}

References

 Complete results, crosstables and history from the CSVN: 1981-2004 ,1981-2004
 Results and crosstables from the CSVN: 2005 edition, 2006 edition
 Report from ChessBase: 2004 edition
 Results from TWIC: 2006 edition
 Web site of the Dutch computer chess association (in Dutch)

Computer chess competitions
Recurring events established in 1981